The Canal de Calais connects the Aa River near Ruminghem to the inner basins of the Port of Calais. Many boats enter the French canal system through the port of Calais and this canal. It is 30 km long and has 3 locks.

History 
Work started on the canal in the late 17th century, but it was not opened until 1758. The canal was enlarged for Class II 'Campinois' and ‘Canal du Nord’ craft in the 1980s over two thirds of its length. The upgrading remains incomplete.

See also
 List of canals in France

References

External links
 Canal de Calais Maps and details of places, ports and moorings on the canal, including the port of Calais as an entry port into the French Waterways. 
 Navigation details for 80 French rivers and canals (French waterways website section)

Canals in France